Samuel Y. Gordon (September 14, 1861 – December 10, 1940) was a Minnesota legislator and the 19th Lieutenant Governor of Minnesota.

Life and career
Gordon was born in Lexington, Indiana in 1861. His family relocated to Minnesota shortly after he was born, living in Meeker County and Traverse County before settling in Browns Valley, Minnesota. Gordon worked with his father's farm equipment business and in 1885 founded a newspaper, The Inter-Lake Tribune. In 1889 or 1890 he married Jennie May Plotner with whom he had four children.

Gordon was involved in local Republican politics in Browns Valley, serving two terms as postmaster in addition to positions with the village council, school board and local Republican party committee. In 1911, Gordon was elected as lieutenant governor under Adolph Olson Eberhart. He served from 1911 to 1913. He also served in the Minnesota House of Representatives from 1914 to 1916 and was associated with the temperance movement.

Gordon died in St. Paul, Minnesota in 1940. He is buried at Sunset Memorial Park Cemetery in Minneapolis, Minnesota.

References

1861 births
1940 deaths
Editors of Minnesota newspapers
Lieutenant Governors of Minnesota
Republican Party members of the Minnesota House of Representatives
Minnesota city council members
School board members in Minnesota
Minnesota postmasters
People from Scott County, Indiana
People from Browns Valley, Minnesota